Jane Haist (March 1, 1949 – May 21, 2022) was a Canadian discus thrower and shot putter, who competed at the 1976 Summer Olympics in Montreal. She is best known for winning two gold medals for Canada at the 1974 Commonwealth Games in the women's discus throw and in the women's shot put event. She was national U.S. collegiate champion in the discus representing the University of Tennessee in 1977.

She died on May 21, 2022 of cancer.

References

External links
 

1949 births
2022 deaths
Sportspeople from St. Catharines
Track and field athletes from Ontario
Canadian female discus throwers
Canadian female shot putters
Olympic track and field athletes of Canada
Athletes (track and field) at the 1976 Summer Olympics
Pan American Games medalists in athletics (track and field)
Athletes (track and field) at the 1975 Pan American Games
Commonwealth Games gold medallists for Canada
Commonwealth Games medallists in athletics
Athletes (track and field) at the 1974 British Commonwealth Games
Pan American Games bronze medalists for Canada
Tennessee Volunteers women's track and field athletes
Medalists at the 1975 Pan American Games
20th-century Canadian women
21st-century Canadian women
Medallists at the 1974 British Commonwealth Games